Li Xiaoting (Chinese: 李晓挺; Pinyin: Lǐ Xiǎotǐng, born 3 January 1989 in Dalian) is a Chinese football player who currently plays for China League One side Jiangxi Liansheng.

Club career
Li started systemic football training in 2000 when he attended Dalian Xigang Sports School and later joined Dalian Yiteng youth team system. He was promoted to the club's first team in 2006 when Dalian Yiteng moved their home stadium to Harbin and changed their name into Harbin Yiteng for the 2006 China League Two campaign. Finishing second place of the league, Harbin Yiteng won promotion to China League One. Li was linked with Dalian Aerbin but finally stayed due to the disagreement of the transfer fee. In the 2011 China League Two campaign he would be part of the team that won the division and promotion into the second tier.

On 28 February 2013, Li signed a five-year contract with Chinese Super League side Changchun Yatai for a transfer fee of ¥2.6 million. He made his debut for Changchun on 16 March, in a 2–0 away defeat against Shandong Luneng, coming on as a substitute for Zhang Wenzhao in the 33rd minute. On 13 April, Li scored his first Super League goal in a match with Changchun tied with Wuhan Zall 1–1.

Li was loaned back to Harbin Yiteng who was newly relegated to China League One for one season on 31 January 2015. On 7 March 2016, he was loaned to China League Two side Shenzhen Renren until 31 December 2016. In March 2017, Li was loaned to Heilongjiang Lava Spring until 31 December 2017. He joined China League Two club Sichuan Longfor on 28 June 2018.

Career statistics 
Statistics accurate as of match played 31 December 2020.

Honours

Club
Harbin Yiteng
 China League Two: 2011

References

External links
 

Living people
1989 births
Chinese footballers
Footballers from Dalian
Changchun Yatai F.C. players
Zhejiang Yiteng F.C. players
Heilongjiang Ice City F.C. players
Sichuan Longfor F.C. players
Jiangxi Beidamen F.C. players
Chinese Super League players
China League One players
China League Two players
Association football defenders 
Association football midfielders